Joe Marinelli is an American actor. Born of Italian parents, he was raised in Meriden, Connecticut, and moved to Southern California in 1961. His father George was a WWII veteran whose goal was to show his family the wonders of the United States. By the time Joe was in the 6th grade, he had traveled by car to every state on the Continent at least two times. After being kicked out of 7th grade English classes several times for making sound effects while the class read stories, teacher Stan Zalas told him that what got him into trouble as a student would make him a wonderful actor. Little did Joe know at the time, Zalas was a graduate of the Pasadena Playhouse and a talented actor himself. He directed Joe through Junior High School (and later when Joe was an adult). From that point on, Joe was in at least two plays every year, but did not want to commit to choosing it as a profession because he didn't want the uncertain lifestyle of an actor. While studying Business at Loyola Marymount University, he was in many plays and acting classes and was accepted into an honor/tutorial program at The Royal Academy of Dramatic Art in London, studying privately with their professors. It was there he learned the integrity of the profession and could accept the lifestyle. After completing his degree in Theater, he continued to study with Jean Muir, Michael Shurtleff, and Stella Adler. Muir and Shurtleff became mentors to him. The ten years following college were filled with constant theater performances in Los Angeles, with little or no pay, and occasional co-starring roles, but mostly making his living as a carpenter. His first break was a Guest Starring role on LA Law, where he was seen by Jill Farren Phelps, Executive Producer of Santa Barbara. She contacted him to audition for the role of Gangster/Crossdesser. Bunny Tagliatti, and this changed his life. He got the part, and later won the Soap Opera Digest Award for Outstanding Comedic Performance in Daytime Television. He has continued working ever since, appearing in television, feature films, and commercials. 

Marinelli has had guest-starring roles on various syndicated night-time series, including NYPD Blue, Lethal Weapon, Agents of S.H.I.E.L.D., Desperate Housewives, Numb3rs, and Victorious.  He has also appeared in commercials and documentaries.

Marinelli is filming The Morning Show for Apple TV, where he plays the role of Director Donny Spagnoli. He lives in Los Angeles with his wife, French hornist Jean Marinelli, and sons Vincent, a film editor and David, a music producer.

Filmography

External links
 
 

American male soap opera actors
Living people
1957 births